The term Texas Gold Coast has been used to refer to different locations along the Texas Coastal Bend.

 South Padre Island, Texas
 The Corpus Christi, Texas area
 The strip of shoreline in the Galveston Bay Area between Morgan's Point and Sylvan Beach. This term was largely used in the early 20th century.